Theotis Brown II (born April 20, 1957) is a former professional American football running back in the National Football League (NFL). He played for six seasons for the St. Louis Cardinals, the Seattle Seahawks, and the Kansas City Chiefs.  His football career was ended by a heart attack at age 27.

Brown was raised in Oakland, California and attended Skyline High School Skyline High School (Oakland, California). His locker mate during high school was the Academy Award-winning actor, Tom Hanks. Aside from football, Brown also played baseball at Skyline.

Nicknamed "Big Foot" and "Chocolate Thunder", Brown rushed for 2,914 yards (No. 7 all-time) as a UCLA Bruin from 1976–1978. He is the father of former UCLA cornerback Theotis "Trey" Brown, III. Brown has one daughter, Taylor.

On November 4, 2011, Brown was inducted into the UCLA Athletics Hall of Fame.

References

External links
 NFL.com player page

1957 births
Living people
Players of American football from Chicago
American football running backs
UCLA Bruins football players
St. Louis Cardinals (football) players
Seattle Seahawks players
Kansas City Chiefs players